Dušan Kovačević (born 12 July 1948) is a Serbian playwright, scriptwriter, film director and academic best known for his theatre plays and movie scripts. He also served as the ambassador of Serbia in Lisbon, Portugal.

Biography
Kovačević was born in Mrđenovac near Šabac, PR Serbia, FPR Yugoslavia, graduated from Svetozar Marković Gymnasium in Novi Sad,  and received a bachelor's degree in dramaturgy from the University of Belgrade in 1973. From 1973, he worked as a dramaturge at TV Beograd for five years. Since 1998, he has been the artistic director of Zvezdara teatar. In 2003 he directed his first movie, Profesionalac (The Professional).

Kovačević's prolific work is well known and popular in Serbia. His comedies have been translated into 17 languages, but his work didn't become available in English until the mid-1990s. One of his plays, Balkan Spy was being rehearsed in Beijing at the time of Tiananmen Square protests, only to be cancelled by the authorities.

A declared royalist, Dušan Kovačević is a member of the Crown Council of Aleksandar Karađorđević. He is also a member of the Serbian Academy of Sciences and Arts. In 2020 he was awarded the Sretenje order of the Republic of Serbia.

His daughter Lena Kovačević is a jazz singer.

Selected works

Plays 
 Radovan Treći - Radovan III (1973)
 Maratonci trče počasni krug - The Marathon Runners Run a Victory Lap of Honor (1973)
 Proleće u januaru - The Spring in January (1977)
 Sabirni centar - The Gathering Place (1982)
 Balkanski špijun - Balkan Spy (1982)
 Sveti Georgije ubiva aždahu - St. George Shoots the Dragon (1984)
 Klaustofobična Komedija  - Claustrophobic Comedy (1987)
 Profesionalac - The Professional (1990)
 Urnebesna Tragedija - Roaring Tragedy (also translated as Tragedy Burlesque; 1990)
 Lari Tompson, tragedija jedne mladosti - Larry Thompson, the Tragedy of a Youth (1996)
 Kontejner sa Pet Zvezdica - Five-Star Dumpster (1999)
 Doktor Šuster - Doctor Shoemaker (2001)
 Generalna proba samoubistva - Dress Rehearsal for a Suicide (2009)
 Život u tesnim cipelama - Life in tight shoes (2011)
 Kumovi - Godfathers (2013)
 Rođendan gospodina Nušića - The birthday of Mr Nušić (2014)
 Hipnoza jedne ljubavi - Hypnosis of one love (2016)

Screenplays 
 Bestije,1977
 Poseban tretman, 1980 (Special Treatment)
 Ko to tamo peva, 1980 (Who's Singing Over There?)
 Maratonci trče počasni krug, 1982 (The Marathon Runners Run a Victory Lap of Honor)
 Balkanski špijun, 1984 (Balkan Spy)
 Sabirni Centar, 1989 (The Gathering Place)
 Pod zemlja, 1995 (Underground), directed by Emir Kusturica, won the Palme d'Or at Cannes Film Festival.
His adaptation of his play called Proleće u januaru (Spring in January).
 Profesionalac, 2003 (The Professional), also director.
 Sveti Georgije ubiva aždahu, 2003 (St. George Kills the Dragon)
 Nije loše biti čovek, 2021 (Not Bad to be a Human),also director.
His adaptation of his play Kumovi.

Poetry 
 Ja to tamo pevam (2020)

See also 
 List of Ambassadors from Serbia

References

 Barnett, Dennis. An interview with Dusan Kovacevic, Belgrade, August 1997.
 Kovačević, Dušan. Odabrane Drame I, Vreme Knjige:Beograd, 1994.
 Kovačević, Dušan. Odabrane Drame II, Vreme Knjige:Beograd, 1994.
 Kovačević, Dušan. Odabrane Drame III, Vreme Knjige:Beograd, 1998.

External links 

 Zvezdara Theater
 
 Intervju: Dušan Kovačević, Wine Style, March 12, 2009
 Srbiju trese pljačkaška groznica, Blic, May 3, 2009

1948 births
Living people
Writers from Šabac
Serbian dramatists and playwrights
Ambassadors of Serbia to Portugal
Members of the Serbian Academy of Sciences and Arts
University of Belgrade alumni
Golden Arena winners
Serbian screenwriters
Male screenwriters